Artyom Aleksandrovich Fedyanin (born 25 April 1994) is a Belarusian professional footballer who plays for Bumprom Gomel.

External links
 
 Profile at Gomel website
 

1995 births
Living people
Belarusian footballers
Association football midfielders
FC Gomel players
FC Rechitsa-2014 players
FC Khimik Svetlogorsk players
FC Osipovichi players
FC Smolevichi players
FC Sputnik Rechitsa players
FC Dnepr Mogilev players